The Paradise Tithing Office is a historic building in Paradise, Utah. It was built in 1876, before Utah became a state, as a tithing building for local members of the Church of Jesus Christ of Latter-day Saints, and it was designed in the Greek Revival architectural style. It has been listed on the National Register of Historic Places since January 25, 1985.

References

National Register of Historic Places in Cache County, Utah
Greek Revival architecture in Utah
Buildings and structures completed in 1876
Tithing buildings of the Church of Jesus Christ of Latter-day Saints
1876 establishments in Utah Territory